Salvia bifidocalyx is a perennial plant that is native to Yunnan province in China, found growing on rocky mountains at  elevation.

The  corolla is yellow-brown, with purple-black spots on lower lip.

Notes

bifidocalyx
Flora of China